Malaysian Wildlife Law consists of the regulation, protection, conservation and management of wildlife in Malaysia. The Constitution of Malaysia empowers those at the federal and the states level to make laws regarding wildlife resources. As such, eleven states in peninsular are managed under an act while Sabah enacted an enactment and Sarawak an ordinance.

Precursor to the Federal Wildlife Act
A Wildlife Commission of Malaya was established by the British colonists in 1932 to make full inquiry into existing regulations for protection of wildlife; ways to deal with wildlife damage to agriculture; and the organisation needed to administer the preservation of wildlife. Some of the major recommendations of the report were:

Appointment of Commissioner for Wildlife and another for National Parks
Establishment of Taman Negara and Krau Game Reserve
Open and close hunting seasons
Total ban on wildlife commercialisation
Appointment of honorary Deputy Wildlife Officers, wildlife rangers as guardian of forest and wildlife
Conservation and management of riverine fish
Establishment of Wildlife Fund.

The report provided the framework for the consolidation of the state game offices and establishment of the Wildlife Ordinance 1955 in Malayan States. Later, the 1955 Ordinance was repealed with the enactment of the Wildlife Protection Act 1972 by the Malaysia Parliament. The 1972 Act enable for the federalisation of all state wildlife departments and appointment of the Director-General of Department of Wildlife and National Parks (DWNP).

List of DWNP Directors-General
 Mr Bernard Thong
 Mr Mohd Khan Bin Momin Khan
 Dato' Musa Nordin
 Dato' Abd Rashid Samsuddin
 Dato’ Abdul Kadir bin Abu Hashim

Federal laws and policies
There are various other laws that mentioned on the wildlife or habitat conservation issues in Malaysia.

State government policy and legislature 
Taman Negara Enactments of 1938 and 1939 in Kelantan, Terengganu and Pahang – Empowers the DWNP to manage Taman Negara with a total area of 4,324.53 km².
River Terrapin Enactment (Kedah) of 1972 – Protection and management of turtles, tortoises and terrapins by DWNP
National Park of Johore Enactment 1989 – Provides for the creation of parks in Johor
State Parks Enactment (Trengganu) of 1987 – Similar to the National Park Act of 1980; but none have been designated yet.

Legislations applicable to Sarawak 
Forest Ordinance 1954 – An Ordinance to provide for the regulation of taking forest produces; protection and management of the forest of Sarawak.
Natural Resources and Environmental Ordinance 1994
National Parks and Nature Reserve Ordinance 1998 (Chapter 27) – An Ordinance for the constitution and management of National Parks and Nature Reserves and all matters incidental thereto.
Wildlife Protection Ordinance 1998 – An Ordinance to provide better provisions for the protection of wild life, the establishment and management of Wild Life Sanctuaries and all matters ancillary thereto.
Sarawak Biodiversity Ordinance 1998

Legislation applicable to Sabah 
Kinabalu Park Ordinance 1962 Sabah Parks – A law for the constitution of the Kinabalu Park
Wildlife Conservation Enactment 1997 – A law for the regulation, protection, conservation and management of wildlife, caves and wildlife areas.
Sabah Biodiversity Enactment 2001 – A law for the regulation of biological research on the natural resources

See also 
 Fisheries Act 1985
 List of national parks in Malaysia
 Sabah Wildlife Department
 Wildlife Conservation Enactment

External links
 Department of Wildlife and National Parks
 Sabah Parks
 Sabah Wildlife Department
 Sarawak Forestry
 Wildlife Conservation Act 2010
 Sarawak Wildlife Protection Ordinance 1998

Malaysian legislation
Nature conservation in Malaysia
Malaysia